Constantine Tessarakontapechys was a Byzantine military governor (strategos)  of the theme of the Peloponnese. He is recorded in the history of Genesios  as being in office when, sometime in the early reign of Emperor Leo VI the Wise (r. 886–912), the Emir of Crete, Abu Abdallah Umar ibn Shu'ayb, suffered a shipwreck off the coast of the Peloponnese and was taken prisoner when he reached the shore.

References

Sources
 

9th-century Byzantine people
Byzantine governors of the Peloponnese
9th century in Greece